The 2013 Scottish Women's Cup is the national cup competition in Scottish women's football. All teams in the Scottish Women's Football League and Premier League are eligible to enter. Caithness Ladies who do not play in national league competition also enter for the second time.

Calendar

Preliminary round
The draw for the preliminary round was announced on 4 April 2013.

First round
The draw for the first round was announced on 25 April 2013.

Second round
The draw for the second round was made on 28 May 2013.

Third round

Quarter-finals

Semi-finals
The draw for the semi-finals took place on 9 September 2013.

Final

References

External links
 Scottish Women's Football

2
Scottish Women's Cup, 2013
Scottish Women's Cup